Mustafa Kemal Atatürk Plaza is a square named after Mustafa Kemal Atatürk founder of the Turkish Republic, located in Beersheba, Israel.

History
The square was completed on 21 October 2002 in collaboration with Israel and Turkey. The square was renamed to Mustafa Kemal Atatürk Plaza in  2008.

Atatürk Monument

In October 2002, a monument to honor the 298 Turkish soldiers who lost their lives during the Battle of Beersheba in 1917 was erected east of the station in cooperation between the Be'er Sheva Municipality and Turkish authorities. 
 
A commemorative plaque was placed at the base of the monument. This plaque was previously located nearby at the Beer Sheva War Cemetery for British and ANZAC soldiers who died in the same battle.

On the square there is a bust of Mustafa Kemal Atatürk which reads his famous quote:

in three different languages. The original, Turkish, Hebrew and English. This was first pronounced by him publicly on 20 April 1931 during his tour of Anatolia. This stance was later integrated and implemented as the foreign policy of the Republic of Turkey. It was erected in 2008.

Sources

References

Squares in Israel
Beersheba
Things named after Mustafa Kemal Atatürk